Robert Sean Wilentz (born February 20, 1951) is the George Henry Davis 1886 Professor of American History at Princeton University, where he has taught since 1979. His primary research interests include U.S. social and political history in the nineteenth and twentieth centuries. He has written numerous award-winning books and articles including, most notably, The Rise of American Democracy: Jefferson to Lincoln, which was awarded the Bancroft Prize and was a finalist for the Pulitzer Prize.

Early life
Robert Sean Wilentz was born on February 20, 1951, in New York City, where his father, Eli Wilentz, and uncle Theodore "Ted" Wilentz, owned a well-known Greenwich Village bookstore, the Eighth Street Bookshop. He is of Jewish and Irish ancestry.

Wilentz attended Midwood High School in Brooklyn, New York, and earned one B.A. at Columbia University in 1972, before earning another at Oxford University (Balliol College) in 1974 on a Kellett Fellowship. One of his mentors at Columbia was scholar of US history James P. Shenton. In 1975 he earned an M.A. at Yale University and in 1980 received his Ph.D., also from Yale, under David Brion Davis's supervision.

Career

Scholarship
Wilentz's historical scholarship has focused on the importance of class and race in the early national period, especially in New York City. Wilentz has also co-authored books on nineteenth-century religion and working-class life. His highly detailed The Rise of American Democracy: Jefferson to Lincoln (W. W. Norton, 2005) won the Bancroft Prize. His goal was to revive the reputation of Andrew Jackson and Jacksonian democracy, which was under attack from the left because of Jackson's support for slavery and pursuit of escaped slaves, and especially his harshness toward Native Americans, including his forced removals of Indian populations from land confiscated by European-ancestry populations. Wilentz returned to the pro-Jackson themes of Arthur Schlesinger Jr., who in 1946 had hailed the pro-labor policies of Northern, urban Jacksonians. He has more recently turned his scholarship to modern U.S. history, notably in The Age of Reagan: A History, 1974–2008, published in May 2008. 

Columbia professor Eric Foner, a long-time friend, says Wilentz "has written some of the very best examples of the avant-garde of the 70s and the avant-garde more recently. Back then we were trying to recover a lost past or neglected past. More recently historians have been trying to integrate that vision into a larger vision of American history as a whole."

While a professor at Princeton, Wilentz was Elena Kagan's senior thesis advisor.

Music
As a contributing editor at The New Republic, Wilentz has published essays about music, the arts, history, and politics. He received a Grammy nomination, and a 2005 ASCAP Deems Taylor Award for the liner notes Wilentz contributed to the album The Bootleg Series Vol. 6: Bob Dylan Live 1964, Concert at Philharmonic Hall.

In 2010, Wilentz published Bob Dylan In America, which placed Dylan in the context of American 20th century history and culture. The book contained essays on Dylan's relationship to Aaron Copland, Allen Ginsberg and the Beat generation, and the recording of Blonde on Blonde.

Politics
Wilentz has prominently engaged in current political debate. He is reportedly a long-time family friend of the Clintons. He has appeared in public venues as a staunch defender of Bill Clinton and Hillary Clinton: he appeared before the House Judiciary Committee on December 8, 1998 to argue against the Clinton impeachment. He told the House members that if they voted for impeachment but were not convinced Clinton's offenses were impeachable, "...history will track you down and condemn you for your cravenness." His testimony cheered Democratic partisans but was criticized by The New York Times, which lamented his "gratuitously patronizing presentation" in an editorial.

In 2006, he wrote an article denouncing the George W. Bush presidency, titled "The Worst President in History?" which appeared in Rolling Stone magazine. The article received a response from National Review, attacking Wilentz's analysis as "blinkered" and calling  him "the modern Arthur Schlesinger Jr."

Wilentz followed up during the 2008 general election with another article in Rolling Stone describing how the failures of the Bush administration had caused a "political meltdown" of the Republican Party, with potentially enormous long-term effects. In the wake of the October, 2013 federal government shutdown, he authored another article in Rolling Stone on what he called a "crisis" within the Republican Party, claiming the party was gradually descending into extremism.

In 2008 Wilentz was an outspoken supporter of Senator Hillary Clinton as the Democratic nominee for the presidency. He wrote an essay in the New Republic analyzing Senator Barack Obama's campaign, charging Obama with creating "manipulative illusion[s]" and "distortions," and having "purposefully polluted the [primary electoral] contest" with "the most outrageous deployment of racial politics since the Willie Horton ad campaign in 1988." During the 2008 Democratic National Convention, Wilentz charged in Newsweek that "liberal intellectuals have largely abdicated their responsibility to provide unblinking and rigorous analysis" of Obama. "Hardly any prominent liberal thinkers" have questioned his "rationalizations" about his relationship to his former pastor, Rev. Jeremiah Wright Jr., or "his patently evasive accounts" of his "ties" to the "unrepentant terrorist William Ayers." For Wilentz, Obama was untested, cloudy, and problematic, with liberal intellectuals giving him a free ride. Wilentz was criticized by bloggers and others for his criticism of Obama.

In January 2014, Wilentz took issue with those involved in the 2013 NSA leaks, in particular Edward Snowden, Glenn Greenwald, and Julian Assange. In Wilentz's view, "the value of some of their revelations does not mean that they deserve the prestige and influence that has been accorded to them. The leakers and their supporters would never hand the state modern surveillance powers, even if they came wrapped in all sorts of rules and regulations that would constrain their abuse. They are right to worry, but wrong – even paranoid – to distrust democratic governments in this way. Surveillance and secrecy will never be attractive features of a democratic government, but they are not inimical to it, either. This the leakers will never understand."

In October 2020, Wilentz called U.S. President Donald Trump "the worst president in American history" for his handling of the COVID-19 pandemic and political polarization of the country. He further wrote that Trump and Attorney General William P. Barr had created the greatest "existential crisis for American democracy" since the American Civil War through their alleged politicization of the U.S. Department of Justice and attempted delegitimization of the 2020 presidential election, comparing Trump's ideology to the Confederacy and calling it "a bacillus of racism and authoritarianism." He also claimed Barr was advancing "an Americanized version of something more akin to Generalissimo Francisco Franco’s Spain" and "a theocracy, overseen by a president who more closely resembles an elected monarch." After the 2021 United States Capitol attack Wilentz predicted that if Trump and the Republican Party returned to power in the 2022 and 2024 elections, they would legally establish "a more or less ironclad system of undemocratic minority rule" to permanently block liberal policies and end majority democracy, calling them "right-wing Bolsheviks." He compared Trump to John C. Calhoun and Richard Nixon.

Personal life
Wilentz lives in Princeton, New Jersey,  with his wife Caroline Cleaves and their children.  Wilentz is a Princeton Athletics Fellow for the Princeton varsity men's baseball team.

Awards
 1984 Beveridge Award from the American Historical Association for Chants Democratic: New York City and the Rise of the American Working Class, 1788–1850
 2006 Bancroft Prize for The Rise of American Democracy: Jefferson to Lincoln

Bibliography

Books
 
Merrill, Michael, and Sean Wilentz, eds. The Key of Liberty: The Life and Democratic Writings of William Manning, "A Laborer," 1747–1814 (1993)
Johnson, Paul E., and Sean Wilentz. The Kingdom of Matthias. (1994)
Andrew Jackson (2005)
The Rise of American Democracy: Jefferson to Lincoln (2005) excerpt and text search
 Wilentz, Sean and Greil Marcus, eds. Rose and the Briar: Death, Love and Liberty in the American Ballad (2005)
 Wilentz, Sean, and Jonathan Earle, eds. Major Problems in the Early Republic (1992; 2nd ed. 2007)
The Age of Reagan: A History, 1974–2008 (2008)
 Bob Dylan in America, 1st ed., New York : Doubleday, 2010. 
President Ulysses S. Grant and the Battle for Equality from Profiles in Leadership W. W. Norton & Company, 2011.
Conant, Sean, ed. Conceived in Liberty: Perspectives on Lincoln at Gettysburg Oxford University Press, 2015.
George W. Bush: The American Presidents Series: The 43rd President, 2001–2009, edited by James Mann; Arthur M. Schlesinger, Jr., and Sean Wilentz, General Editors (2015)
The Politicians and the Egalitarians: The Hidden History of American Politics,  W. W. Norton & Company, 2016. 
No Property in Man: Slavery and Antislavery at the Nation’s Founding, Harvard University Press, 2018.  
Wilentz, Sean Fred W. McDarrah: New York Scenes, Abrams Books, 2018

Academic papers
On Class and Politics in Jacksonian America, Reviews in American History, Vol. 10, No. 4, The Promise of American History: Progress and Prospects (Dec., 1982), pp. 45–63
"Against Exceptionalism: Class Consciousness and the American Labor Movement, 1790–1920," International Labor and Working Class History, 26 (Fall 1984): 1–24,

Articles
"The Sedition of Donald Trump" Rolling Stone Magazine, October 11, 2020

Book reviews

Critical studies and reviews of Wilentz's work
The Age of Reagan : a history, 1974–2008
 John Ehrman, "There He Goes Again: A review of The Age of Reagan: A History, 1974-2008, Sean Wilentz" The Claremont Institute (2008), review by conservative scholar
The rise of American democracy : Jackson to Lincoln
 Altschuler, Glenn C. "Democracy as a Work in Progress," Reviews in American History, Volume 34, Number 2, June 2006, pp. 169–175 in Project Muse, review of The Rise of American Democracy: Jefferson to Lincoln

References

External links
 Wilentz interview from 2005
 Wilentz interview NPR 2010
 
C-SPAN Q&A interview with Wilentz, May 7, 2006

1951 births
Living people
21st-century American historians
21st-century American male writers
Alumni of Balliol College, Oxford
20th-century American Jews
American writers about music
Columbia College (New York) alumni
The New York Review of Books people
Princeton University faculty
Yale University alumni
Bancroft Prize winners
American male non-fiction writers
21st-century American Jews
Midwood High School alumni